Fahlcrantz is a Swedish surname. Notable people with the name include:
 Carl Johan Fahlcrantz (1774–1861), Swedish painter
 Christian Eric Fahlcrantz (1780–1866), Swedish theologian and author
 Greta Fahlcrantz (1889–1978), Swedish painter and sculptor